Avonmore stop is a tram stop under construction in the Edmonton Light Rail Transit network in Edmonton, Alberta, Canada. It will serve the Valley Line, and is located in 83 Street, staggered on either side of 73 Avenue, in Avonmore. Northbound passengers will board the train north of 73 Avenue, while southbound passengers will board south of 73 Avenue. The stop was scheduled to open in 2020; however, as of December 2022 the  Valley Line had not opened and no definite opening date had been announced.

Around the station
Avonmore
Argyll Velodrome

References

External links
TransEd Valley Line LRT

Edmonton Light Rail Transit stations
Railway stations under construction in Canada
Valley Line (Edmonton)